Teng Jin-guang (born March 1964) is a Chinese scientist and educator, currently serving as the president of the Hong Kong Polytechnic University since July 1, 2019. Previously he served as the vice-president of Southern University of Science and Technology.

Early life and education
Teng was born in Yongjia County, Zhejiang in March 1964. He secondary studied at Laowu High School (now Luofu High School). In 1979 he entered Zhejiang University, where he graduated in 1983. In 1985 he was sent to the University of Sydney to study at the expense of the government. He did post-doctoral research at the University of Edinburgh under the supervision of John Michael Rotter.

Career
In April 1991 he became an instructor at James Cook University. He joined the Department of Civil and Structural Engineering faculty of Hong Kong Polytechnic University in October 1994, becoming associate professor in 1997 and dean and full professor in 1999. In September 2006 he was promoted to become vice-president, a position he held until June 2010. He was dean of the School of Construction and Environment in September 2007, and held that office until June 2013. In April 2018 he became vice-president of Southern University of Science and Technology and dean of its Graduate School.

On March 26, 2019, he was hired as President of Hong Kong Polytechnic University. He officially served as president of PolyU since July 1, 2019. In October 2019, he was criticised for refusing to shake hands with graduates wearing masks in a graduation ceremony.

Honours and awards
 2015 Fellow of the Royal Society of Edinburgh (RSE)
 November 2017 Member of the Chinese Academy of Sciences (CAS)

References

1964 births
Living people
People from Yongjia County
Zhejiang University alumni
University of Sydney alumni
Scientists from Wenzhou
Academic staff of Hong Kong Polytechnic University
Fellows of the Royal Society of Edinburgh
Members of the Chinese Academy of Sciences
Educators from Wenzhou
Members of the Election Committee of Hong Kong, 2021–2026